The 2014–15 season will be Kecskeméti TE's 7th competitive season, 7th consecutive season in the OTP Bank Liga and 103rd year in existence as a football club.

First team squad

Transfers

Summer

In:

Out:

List of Hungarian football transfers summer 2014

Statistics

Appearances and goals
Last updated on 6 December 2014.

|-
|colspan="14"|Youth players:

|-
|colspan="14"|Players no longer at the club:

|}

Top scorers
Includes all competitive matches. The list is sorted by shirt number when total goals are equal.

Last updated on 6 December 2014

Disciplinary record
Includes all competitive matches. Players with 1 card or more included only.

Last updated on 6 December 2014

Overall
{|class="wikitable"
|-
|Games played || 26 (18 OTP Bank Liga, 3 Hungarian Cup and 5 Hungarian League Cup)
|-
|Games won || 10 (7 OTP Bank Liga, 2 Hungarian Cup and 1 Hungarian League Cup)
|-
|Games drawn || 5 (4 OTP Bank Liga, 0 Hungarian Cup and 1 Hungarian League Cup)
|-
|Games lost || 11 (7 OTP Bank Liga, 1 Hungarian Cup and 3 Hungarian League Cup)
|-
|Goals scored || 37
|-
|Goals conceded || 37
|-
|Goal difference || 0
|-
|Yellow cards || 59
|-
|Red cards || 2
|-
|rowspan="1"|Worst discipline ||  Endre Botka (5 , 1 )
|-
|rowspan="1"|Best result || 8–0 (A) v Nyíradony - Magyar Kupa - 13-08-2014
|-
|rowspan="1"|Worst result || 2–5 (A) v Vác - Magyar Kupa - 24-09-2014
|-
|rowspan="1"|Most appearances ||  Zsolt Balázs (22 appearances)
|-
|rowspan="1"|Top scorer ||  Bebeto (7 goals)
|-
|Points || 35/78 (44.3%)
|-

Nemzeti Bajnokság I

Matches

Classification

Results summary

Results by round

Hungarian Cup

League Cup

Group stage

References

External links
 Eufo
 Official Website
 UEFA
 fixtures and results

Kecskeméti TE seasons
Hungarian football clubs 2014–15 season